Hege Riise (born 18 July 1969) is a Norwegian football coach and former midfield player who is coaching the Norway women's national football team. One of the best footballers of her generation, she won the FIFA Women's World Cup, the Olympic Games, and the UEFA Women's Euro with the Norway women's national football team.

Playing career

Club
Riise started playing football at age six and played in a boys' team until age 14. She won the Norwegian Cup competition with Setskog-Høland in 1992. In late 1995 along with four other Norwegians she joined Nikko Securities Dream Ladies football club in Japan. Nikko won the Japanese league and cup competitions in 1996 and the cup in 1997, after which Riise moved back to Norway to play again with Setskog-Høland.

She joined Asker FK, in 2000, and again won the cup competition with Asker the same year. Drafted by the Carolina Courage in the Women's United Soccer Association 2000 Foreign Draft, Riise was the team's MVP two times and led the Courage to a WUSA Founders Cup title in 2002, before her involvement was curtailed by an anterior cruciate ligament injury. In 2003 the Norwegian Football Association named Riise the best female Norwegian footballer ever.

Returning to Norway in 2005 Hege Riise joined Team Strømmen of Oslo and became the club's playing assistant trainer in 2006. She played her last top-level match with Team Strømmen on 28 October 2006 aged 37 and retired from football as a player.

International
Riise made her international debut with the Norwegian national team in 1990. Norway won the UEFA Women's Championship in 1993. Two years later with Norway she won the Women's World Cup and was awarded the Golden Ball after the competition.

Riise's biggest achievement with Norway was winning the gold medal at the 2000 Summer Olympics in Sydney, to become one of only three women in the world to win the Olympics, the World Cup and the European Championship (with Gro Espeseth and Bente Nordby).

She retired from international football in September 2004 with 188 caps and 58 goals.

International goals

Coaching career
Riise retired as a player at the end of the 2006 season with 188 international caps to her credit, the record for all Norwegian footballers. In 2007, she became the chief trainer at Team Strømmen, in the Norwegian women's premier league, the Toppserien. In the 2008 season, Team Strømmen were runners-up in both the league and the Cup competitions.

On 28 January 2009, Riise was appointed Assistant Trainer to the USA women's national team.

Riise was appointed interim head coach of the England women's national football team in January 2021. Her tenure bridged the gap between the resignation of Phil Neville, who had originally agreed to see out his contract, and his already-agreed-upon replacement, the incumbent Netherlands head coach Sarina Wiegman due to start in September 2021. Due to the reduced international schedule as a result of the COVID-19, Riise only took charge of three friendlies: defeating Northern Ireland 6–0 in her debut before losing to France and Canada. On 10 March 2021, she was also announced as the manager for Team GB at the delayed 2020 Tokyo Olympics. The team progressed as group winners with seven points in three games before being eliminated in the first knockout round by Australia 4–3 in extra-time.

After her stint in the United Kingdom, Riise fulfilled a prior agreement to take charge of the Norway women's national under-19 football team. In the 2022 UEFA Under-19 Championship, Norway won their group and came second overall, after being defeated 2-1 in the final by Spain.

On August 3, Riise was officially appointed as Norway head coach replacing Martin Sjögren. The rest of the coaching team consists of the assistant coaches Monica Knudsen and Ingvild Stensland, and the goalkeeping coach Jon Knudsen.

Honours

Player
Norway
FIFA Women's World Cup: 1995
UEFA Women's Championship: 1993
Summer Olympics gold medal: 2000
Summer Olympics bronze medal: 1996

Individual
FIFA Women's World Cup Golden Ball: 1995
UEFA Women's Championship Golden player: 1993

Manager
LSK Kvinner
Toppserien: 2016, 2017, 2018, 2019
Norwegian Women's Cup: 2016, 2018, 2019
Norway Under-19

 UEFA Women's Under-19 Championship silver medal: 2022

References

1969 births
Living people
Norwegian women's footballers
Norwegian women's football managers
Footballers at the 1996 Summer Olympics
Footballers at the 2000 Summer Olympics
Olympic gold medalists for Norway
Olympic bronze medalists for Norway
Olympic footballers of Norway
Kniksen Award winners
Women's United Soccer Association players
Carolina Courage players
Norwegian expatriate women's footballers
Norwegian expatriate football managers
Expatriate women's soccer players in the United States
Asker Fotball (women) players
Toppserien players
People from Lørenskog
Norwegian expatriate sportspeople in the United States
Norwegian expatriate sportspeople in Japan
FIFA Century Club
Olympic medalists in football
1991 FIFA Women's World Cup players
Norway women's international footballers
1995 FIFA Women's World Cup players
1999 FIFA Women's World Cup players
2003 FIFA Women's World Cup players
FIFA Women's World Cup-winning players
Medalists at the 2000 Summer Olympics
Medalists at the 1996 Summer Olympics
Nikko Securities Dream Ladies players
Women's association football midfielders
UEFA Women's Championship-winning players
Great Britain women's Olympic football team managers
Norway women's national football team managers
LSK Kvinner FK managers
Sportspeople from Viken (county)